Darren Sarll (born 2 February 1983) is an English professional football manager and coach who is manager of  club Woking.

Sarll began his career in football as a midfielder in non-League football and entered management with English Football League club Stevenage in 2016. Following his departure in 2018, he managed National League clubs Yeovil Town and Woking.

Playing career 
A midfielder, Sarll began his career in the Ipswich Town youth system and later joined the youth team at Isthmian League Premier Division club Hitchin Town, from which he graduated into the first team, before departing in 2002. He subsequently played in the Conference South, the Southern League and the Spartan South Midlands League for Berkhamsted Town, Bedford Town, St Albans City, Chelmsford City, Dunstable Town, Hemel Hempstead Town, Chesham United and Biggleswade United. After taking up coaching and dropping out of non-League football, he moved into Sunday league football.

Managerial and coaching career

Stevenage Borough 
Sarll began his coaching career with Conference club Stevenage Borough and served as a coach in a variety of youth and reserve roles. During the 2006–07 season, he managed the youth team to the final of the Colwyn Cup, which was lost to Dunstable Town.

Brentford 
Sarll joined League Two club Brentford as youth team manager prior to the beginning of the 2008–09 season. After the promotion of first team assistant manager Andy Scott to the full-time managerial post halfway through the season, Sarll also assisted Scott as first team coach and also became the first manager of the reformed reserve team in 2009. He left the club at the end of the 2010–11 season.

Rotherham United 
Sarll followed Andy Scott to League Two club Rotherham United in July 2011 and took over the role of Head of Player Development. After Scott's sacking in March 2012, Sarll departed the Don Valley Stadium at the end of the 2011–12 season.

Return to Stevenage 
Sarll returned to Stevenage, then having risen through the pyramid to League One, in June 2012. He held the role of Head of Youth until 2 June 2015, when he was promoted to first team coach after the appointment of Teddy Sheringham as manager. After the sacking of Sheringham on 1 February 2016, Sarll was named as caretaker manager. Five days later, Sarll's first match in charge resulted in a 1–0 League Two defeat to Crawley Town. After losing six of his first 9 matches, Stevenage sought the services of Glenn Roeder to advise Sarll. Under Sarll's guidance, Stevenage ended the season with one loss from their final 9 matches and rose from the relegation places to finish 18th. Sarll was given the manager's job on a permanent basis in May 2016.

The 2016–17 season proved to be one of inconsistency, despite an undefeated run of eight wins in 9 matches establishing the club in the playoff zone by March 2017. 16 points from six matches in February won Sarll the League Two Manager of the Month award. Any promotion hopes were extinguished with a winless run in the final six matches of the season and the club finished in 10th place. During the season, Sarll oversaw the transition of Dale Gorman, Jamie Gray, Mark McKee and Luke Wade-Slater from the academy set-up into the first-team. The 2017–18 season began with wins in six of the opening 11 matches, before the inconsistency of the previous seasons set in. Despite strengthening the squad with a number of new signings in January 2018, a run of just four wins from 26 league matches between October 2017 and March 2018 led to Sarll's sacking on 18 March 2018.

Two days after Sarll's departure as manager, chairman Phil Wallace stated he had a "very high opinion" of Sarll and that it was always his intention to keep him on in a "technical development role". Sarll was appointed to oversee all of the club's youth development, both domestically and overseas and he took up the new position on 28 March 2018, before departing Broadhall Way in June 2018.

Watford
On 13 June 2018, it was announced that Sarll had joined the academy at Premier League club Watford and he would work with the older age groups and share the role of Head of Academy. He was suspended, following allegations of bullying, on 30 January 2019 and "amicably parted ways" with the club two weeks later.

Yeovil Town 
On 19 June 2019, Sarll signed a three-year contract to manage newly-relegated National League club Yeovil Town. He got off to a good start, taking maximum points in September 2019 to win the National League Manager of the Month award. The club's 2019–20 season ended with defeat in the National League playoff quarter-finals and a mid-table 2020–21 followed. Following a slow start to the 2021–22 season, Sarll won his second National League Manager of the Month award after four wins from five in November 2021. Sarll departed Huish Park on 28 March 2022.

Woking 
On 28 March 2022, Sarll signed a two-year contract to manage National League club Woking. An impressive start to the season saw Woking firmly in the play-off picture, leading to Sarll winning the Manager of the Month award for November 2022.

Career statistics

Player

Manager

Honours
EFL League Two Manager of the Month: February 2017
National League Manager of the Month: September 2019, November 2021, November 2022

References

External links 
 
Darren Sarll at ytfc.net

1983 births
Living people
English footballers
Association football midfielders
English Football League managers
Hitchin Town F.C. players
Berkhamsted Town F.C. players
Bedford Town F.C. players
St Albans City F.C. players
Dunstable Town F.C. players
Hemel Hempstead Town F.C. players
Chesham United F.C. players
Biggleswade United F.C. players
Brentford F.C. non-playing staff
Rotherham United F.C. non-playing staff
Stevenage F.C. managers
National League (English football) players
Isthmian League players
Southern Football League players
English football managers
Chelmsford City F.C. players
Yeovil Town F.C. managers
Woking F.C. managers
National League (English football) managers
People from Hitchin
Association football coaches